Christine Maple (born Christine Raphael; November 16, 1912 – January 13, 1947) was an American actress in the 1930s who appeared in Western films and serials.

Biography
Maple was born in Belle-Plaine, Kansas. Her parents divorced and she lived with her mother who remarried and moved to Los Angeles. Maple competed in beauty pageants which led to her being offered a role in the short Fifty Million Husbands (1930). She became a controversial figure and was at one time committed to a sanatorium after an alleged nervous breakdown. She signed a contract with Republic Pictures in 1936 and appeared in four films including the Westerns The Big Show and Roarin' Lead. In the latter, she was the female lead alongside The Three Mesquiteers.

Her career collapsed and she had health issues for many years. Eventually, she moved to Langhorne, Pennsylvania and worked in a department store. On January 12, 1947, she committed suicide by hanging. Her body was cremated.

Filmography

 Fifty Million Husbands (1930; short) as Pansy Chase
 Whoopee! (1930) as Goldwyn Girl (uncredited)
 The Naggers at the Dentist's (1931; short) – undetermined role
 Good Sport (1931) as Party Girl
 Then Came the Yawn (1932; short) as Joan Clifton
 The Big Show (1936) as Elizabeth van Every
 Roarin' Lead (1936) as Doris Moore
 Beware of Ladies (1936) as Randall's Secretary (uncredited)
 A Man Betrayed (1936) as Helen Vincent

References

External links
 
 

1912 births
1947 deaths
20th-century American actresses
American film actresses
Film serial actresses
Western (genre) film actresses
Suicides by hanging in Pennsylvania